"Et je t'aime encore" (meaning "And I Still Love You") is the second single from Celine Dion's album, 1 fille & 4 types (2003). It was released on 23 February 2004 in Francophone countries. An English-language version of this song was released earlier on the One Heart album with a different title "Je T'aime Encore". The song was written by Jean-Jacques Goldman, who worked with Dion on D'eux album in 1995 and S'il suffisait d'aimer in 1998.

Background and release
On 1 October 2003 Dion taped the 1 fille & 4 types TV special at the Caesars Palace in Las Vegas, where she performed this song among others.

The music video, directed by Yannick Saillet, was filmed in Las Vegas in October 2003 and released in late December. It was included on Dion's 2005 video compilation On Ne Change Pas. The song reached top 20 in the Francophone countries, including number 14 in Belgium Wallonia and number 16 in France. It was also very popular in Quebec, peaking at number 2.

"Et je t'aime encore" was performed during the A New Day... show, from November 2003 till mid-2004, and included on the A New Day... Live in Las Vegas album. It was also featured on Dion's greatest hits compilation On ne change pas in 2005. "Et je t'aime encore" was performed in 2016 during Dion's Summer Tour 2016 and her French concerts in 2017.

Critical reception
Betty Clarke from The Guardian wrote about the English version: "But when she stops trying to be relevant and ceases to be a one-trick pony with a vast lung capacity (as she does on the folky Je T'aime Encore), Dion proves she can be more than a series of hollow - if album-shifting - sentiments."

Track listing and formats
European CD single
"Et je t'aime encore" – 3:26
"Et je t'aime encore" (Instrumental Version) – 3:26
"Apprends-moi" – 4:45

European CD maxi-single
"Et je t'aime encore" – 3:26
"Et je t'aime encore" (Instrumental Version) – 3:26
"Des milliers de baisers" – 3:46
"Tu nages" – 3:09

Charts

Weekly charts

Year-end charts

Release history

References 

Celine Dion songs
2004 singles
French-language songs
Songs written by Jean-Jacques Goldman
2003 songs
Songs written by Robert Goldman (songwriter)
Epic Records singles
Columbia Records singles